Inoslav Bešker (born 30 January 1950) is a Croatian and Italian journalist and academic.<ref name=Mediteran>Bilješka o piscu, in: Bešker, Inoslav, Mediteran u književnosti“, Zagreb, 2021: 231.</ref>

Bešker started his journalistic career in 1967. Since 1989 he has been working as a correspondent from Rome for Vjesnik, Večernji list, BBC, Radio 101, Danas, Croatian Radiotelevision, and Globus. Since 2000 he has been a correspondent and columnist for Jutarnji list.

Bešker has a degree in journalism from the University of Zagreb. He obtained a PhD in Comparative Slavic studies from the University of Milan in 2001.  He currently teaches literatures on Mediterranean at the University of Split. He also taught Slavic studies at University of Naples "L'Orientale", Sapienza University of Rome, University of Bologna, and Communication studies at the University of Zagreb and University of Dubrovnik.  His research interests also include Morlachs in European literature, onomastics of Croatia, toponomastics of the Balkans, heortology and anthropology of religion. He has been a supporter of democratic left-wing causes and was a member of the advisory board of the Novi Plamen magazine.

His most important books in the field of journalism include: Istraživačko novinarstvo (Investigative journalism, Zagreb, 2004), Iza vatikanskih zidina (Behind the Vatican walls, Zagreb, 2013), the biographies of the popes John Paul II and Francis; in the field of comparative literature and imagology: I Morlacchi nella letteratura europea (The Morlachs in the European literature, Rome, 2007), La musa violenta (The violent Muse, Rome, 2007), Mediteran u književnosti (The Mediterranean in literature, Zagreb, 2021); in the field of anthropology of religion: Blagdani (Holidays, Zagreb, 2020), and Svetost i zločin (Holiness and crime, Zagreb, 2022).

In 2003 Bešker received a Journalist of the Year award by the Croatian Journalists' Association and in 2007 a Life Achievement Award from the same organization He is a laureate of The Otto von Habsburg'' Prize for Journalism in Minority Protection and Cultural Diversity in Europe.

Sources
 Inoslavu Beškeru nagrada za životno djelo  
 
 Inoslav Bešker at the Croatian Writers Society

References

1950 births
Journalists from Zagreb
Croatian columnists
Croatian expatriates in Italy
Faculty of Political Sciences, University of Zagreb alumni
Academic staff of the University of Bologna
Living people
Journalists from Split, Croatia